, abbreviated as Chikujo (筑女, Chikujo) is a private women's college in Dazaifu, Fukuoka, Japan.

Overview 
The university is owned by Chikushi Jogakuen Educational Corporation (学校法人筑紫女学園, Gakkō Hōjin Chikushi Jogakuen), which is a member of Ryūkoku Sōgō Gakuen (龍谷総合学園, Ryūkoku Sōgō Gakuen), an alliance of Hongan-ji Jōdo Shinshū Buddhist schools.

The university aims to provide an education based on a Buddhist ethos.

History 
The educational corporation originated with the opening of Chikushi Private Girls High School (私立筑紫高等女学校, shiritsu Chikushi kōtō jogakkō) in 1907. The junior college, Chikushi Jogakuen Junior College (筑紫女学園短期大学, Chikushi jogakuen tanki daigaku) opened in 1965, and the four-year university opened in 1988.

Academics 
The university comprises the following faculties and departments:

Undergraduate 

 Faculty of Literature
 Department of Japanese Language and Literature
 Department of English
 Department of Asian Studies
 Faculty of Human Sciences
 Faculty of Contemporary Social Studies
 Department of Contemporary Social Studies

Graduate 

 Graduate School of Human Sciences

References

External links 

 Official website (in Japanese)

Educational institutions established in 1988
Private universities and colleges in Japan
Universities and colleges in Fukuoka Prefecture
Women's universities and colleges in Japan
Buildings and structures in Dazaifu, Fukuoka
1988 establishments in Japan